This is a list of Danish football transfers for the 2018 summer transfer window. Only transfers featuring Danish Superliga are listed.

Danish Superliga

Note: Flags indicate national team as has been defined under FIFA eligibility rules. Players may hold more than one non-FIFA nationality.

Aalborg

In:

Out:

Aarhus

In:

Out:

Brøndby

In:

Out:

Copenhagen

In:

Out:

Esbjerg

In:

Out:

Hobro

In:

Out:

Horsens

In:

Out:

Midtjylland

In:

Out:

Nordsjælland

In:

Out:

OB

In:

 

Out:

Randers

In:

Out:

SønderjyskE

In:

Out:

Vejle

In:

Out:

Vendsyssel

In:

Out:

References

External links
 Official site of the DBU
 Official site of the Danish Superliga

Football transfers summer 2018
2018
2017–18 in Danish football
2018–19 in Danish football